U.S. Città di Palermo spent the 2008–09 season in the Serie A, the fifth season in a row for the Sicilian club in the Italian top flight since their return to the league in 2004.

Review and events

For the upcoming season, Palermo are expected to confirm Stefano Colantuono as head coach. A number of signings were completed in mid-season, namely Brazilian striker Túlio de Melo from Le Mans (free transfer), and young Danish defender Simon Kjær from Midtjylland; these are expected to be joined by a number of loan and co-ownership returns, such as Hernan Dellafiore from Torino. On May 28, Palermo announced to have signed Empoli defender Andrea Raggi in a full transfer. Two days later, the rosanero also finalized the signing of former Fiorentina midfielder Fabio Liverani. On June 5 Palermo announced on their website to have finalized the signing of Italy national team and Livorno goalkeeper Marco Amelia.

On June 19, Palermo announced to have re-signed Croatian striker Igor Budan from Parma and Genoa defender Cesare Bovo, the latter in exchange with long-time rosanero Giuseppe Biava. Six days later, the club completed the signing of Atalanta centre-back Moris Carrozzieri. On July 1, the club finalized the signing of Davide Lanzafame from Juventus in a co-ownership bid.

In addition, Palermo-born Giovanni Tedesco and 41-year-old goalkeeper Alberto Fontana have agreed a one-year contract extension.

On the other hand, a number of transfer were completed, with Amauri sold to Juventus (and Antonio Nocerino being signed by Palermo as part of the deal), Leandro Rinaudo transferred to Napoli and Italian internationals Cristian Zaccardo and Andrea Barzagli signed by German side VfL Wolfsburg;

Palermo's pre-season phase will begin on July 14 to the training camp of Bad Kleinkirchheim, Austria. They then moved to another camp in Levico Terme on August 1, then playing a friendly match in Wolfsburg against VfL Wolfsburg.

Palermo started their season with a surprise 1–2 home loss to Ravenna, a Lega Pro Prima Divisione team (two divisions below Serie A). Successively, Zamparini confirmed the intention to sell newly acquired striker Túlio de Melo, citing the impossibility to ensure the player a guaranteed place in the starting lineup as he wanted. In the meantime, on August 30, and just a few hours before the rosanero'''s kickoff league match, Palermo announced the signing of 18-year-old striker Levan Mchedlidze on loan. The next day, Lille confirmed to have finalized the permanent signing of Melo from Palermo. On 1 September, Palermo completed both the signing of Davide Succi from Ravenna the loaning out of Boško Janković to Genoa. Both moves were finalized following several unsuccessful attempts to sign Brazilian international striker Nilmar from Internacional, as confirmed in a club statement.

The very next day saw notable criticism from supporters and local and national media regarding the club's strategy in the transfer market, particularly underlining the lack of an appropriate replacement for Amauri and the controversial sale of Túlio de Melo a mere two months after signing with the rosanero. Zamparini responded to these criticisms by making the whole bid amounts in the seasons available to the public, in a very unusual move in Italy, noting his club was among the ones who spent the most money in order to sign new players.

On September 4, 2008, in what was promptly received as another controversial move, the club surprisingly announced the immediate dismissal of Stefano Colantuono from his position, making him the first head coach to be sacked in the whole Serie A season, contemporaneously announcing the appointment of Davide Ballardini as new rosanero boss. Ballardini made his debut with an impressive 3–1 home win to Roma on September 13.

Ballardini then followed up the next week by beating Genoa 2–1, with centre-back Cesare Bovo scored a winning goal from 26 metres out.

Palermo's wonderful form continued as they stopped Italian giants Juventus 2–1, ending their unbeaten season. Fabrizio Miccoli scored a tap-in after Buffon deflected a volley from Uruguayan striker Edinson Cavani. Newly acquired youngster Levan Mchedlidze scored in only his second-ever game in the Italian Serie A, grabbing Palermo a surprise win. Palermo then went on to achieve impressive wins to less exciting games, not performing particularly well in away matches. Namely, striking duo of Fabrizio Miccoli and Edinson Cavani proved to be instrumental to the rosaneros successes, with the former Benfica star establishing himself as team topscorer despite being limited by injuries.

Another fan favourite win came in a league match against A.C. Milan, with the rosanero showing probably one of their finest seasonal performances and defeating 3–1 the rossoneri, with goals by Miccoli, Cavani and Simplicio, and Sicilian goalkeeper Marco Amelia being instrumental in the team win by saving a penalty shot by FIFA World Player winner Ronaldinho.

In the January 2009 transfer window, Palermo opted to loan out all of their players who did not play regularly in the first half, namely Hernán Paolo Dellafiore, Andrea Raggi, Davide Lanzafame and Maurizio Ciaramitaro. The club, with Igor Budan being unavailable for the whole season so far, was also linked with being interested to the likes of ACF Fiorentina striker Giampaolo Pazzini, who was ultimately acquired by Sampdoria. Later in the market window, Palermo also announced the loan of Ciro Capuano to Sicilian rivals Catania, and the signing for free of Mirko Savini from Napoli, then completing the transfer session with two international youngsters, Swiss full-back Michel Morganella and Uruguayan striker Abel Hernández.

The club went on performing relatively well with several ups and downs, the bottom point being a shock 0–4 home loss to Catania in the Sicilian derby, which was promptly followed by a 2–0 win at ACF Fiorentina's home. Palermo also managed to come back from two goals down to achieve a 2–2 draw at San Siro against José Mourinho's league leaders Internazionale thanks to efforts from Edinson Cavani and backup striker Davide Succi. In the second part of the season, Palermo declared interest in fighting to take a UEFA Europa League 2009–10 spot, with Roma, league surprise Cagliari and Lazio as main challengers.

On April 23, the Italian National Olympic Committee announced that Moris Carrozzieri was found positive for cocaine as he failed a doping test made immediately after a home game against Torino on April 5. The physical centre-back was immediately suspended from football activities and is likely to face a long ban that could keep him off from the game for up to two years. According to Palermo chairman Maurizio Zamparini and sports director Walter Sabatini, the player might likely have assumed cocaine during a night out in a club in Milan. Such events, which prived Palermo of one of the main defenders in the squad, were followed by a 0–3 loss to AC Milan, with two of the rossoneri goals being scored from controversial penalty kicks and Palermo reduced to 10 men after Cesare Bovo was sent off minutes after the beginning of the second half; this brought to bitter criticism against the referee from Maurizio Zamparini, who also announced a one-day news blackout as a form of protest.

Confirmed summer transfer market bidsInOutOut on loanConfirmed winter transfer market bidsInOut on loan'Player detailsSeason statistics|-
|colspan="12"|Players sold or loaned out during the summer transfer market:|-
|colspan="12"|Players sold or loaned out during the winter transfer market:''

|}

Competitions

Serie A

Matches

Coppa Italia

See also
2008–09 in Italian football

References

Palermo F.C. seasons
Palermo